Zoltan Sztehlo (27 November 1921 – 16 June 1990) was a Hungarian-Canadian equestrian. He competed at the 1968 Summer Olympics.

References

1921 births
1990 deaths
Hungarian male equestrians
Canadian male equestrians
Canadian dressage riders
Olympic equestrians of Canada
Equestrians at the 1968 Summer Olympics
Sportspeople from Budapest
Hungarian emigrants to Canada
Pan American Games medalists in equestrian
Pan American Games gold medalists for Canada
Equestrians at the 1971 Pan American Games
Medalists at the 1971 Pan American Games